This is a list of the number-one songs of 2018 in Colombia according to National-Report and Monitor Latino. Both charts are based on airplay across radio stations in Colombia; Monitor Latino uses the Radio Tracking Data, LLC in real time, whereas National-Report uses a system by Media-Scanner. Monitor Latino's charts are compiled from Monday to Sunday, while National-Report's charts are compiled from Friday to Thursday.

Besides the General chart, Monitor Latino also publishes "Vallenato", "Crossover", "Pop", "Tropical", "Urbano", "Popular" and "Anglo" charts for Colombia. National-Report also provides charts with those names, with the addition of "Latino" and "Rock" charts. Beginning in the June 17 week, Monitor Latino ceased to publish the separate Audience and Spins charts, instead publishing a combined chart.

Chart history (Monitor Latino)

Chart history (National Report)

References 

Number-one songs
Colombia
Colombian record charts